Walter Darwin Coy (January 31, 1909 – December 11, 1974) was an American stage, radio, film, and, principally, television actor, arguably most well known as John Wayne's character's brother in The Searchers (1956).

Early years
Originally from Great Falls, Montana, Coy was the son of Theodore Coy, who had a furniture store. The family moved to Seattle, Washington, around 1923. He played varsity football at the University of Washington and majored in dramatics.

Before Coy became an actor, he worked at salmon canneries in Alaska. In 1929, he moved to New York. During World War II, he served in the Army.

Career
Coy performed on Broadway from 1930 to 1948. He appeared in several early Group Theatre productions. He was the first actor to play Lone Wolf on the radio series of the same name.

Broadway roles

 The House of Connelly (1931) - Charlie and as Seranader
 Night Over Taos (1932) - Felipe
 Men in White (1933) - Dr. Bradley
 Gold Eagle Guy (1934) - Adam Keane
 Till the Day I Die (1935) - Karl Taussig
 Waiting For Lefty (1935) - Irv
 Paradise Lost (1935) - Ben
 Case of Clyde Griffiths (1936) - Gilbert Griffiths
 Many Mansions (1937) - George Graham
 Lady in the Dark (1941) - Charley Johnson (replacement)
 Hamlet (1945) - Horatio

Western programs
Of the 31 Frontier episodes, 16 are narrated by Coy:

 "Paper Gunman" (September 25, 1955)
 "Tomas and the Widow" (October 2)
 "A Stillness in Wyoming" (October 16)
 "The Shame of a Nation" (October 23)
 "In Nebraska" (October 30)
 "The Suspects" (November 6)
 "King of the Dakotas" (2 parts, November 8 and 20)
 "Cattle Drive to Casper" (November 27)
 "The Texicans" (January 8, 1956)
 "Mother of the Brave" (January 15)
 "The Ten Days of John Leslie" (January 22)
 "The Devil and Dr. O'Hara" (February 5)
 "Assassin" (March 4)
 "The Hanging at Thunder Butte Creek (March 18)
 "The Hostage" (September 9, 1956)

Coy also appeared on Jim Davis' western anthology series, Stories of the Century in the role of Sam Clayton in the 1954 episode entitled "Tom Horn," an account of the western lawman-turned outlaw Tom Horn. He appeared on many other western television programs, including Cheyenne, Bronco, Cimarron City, The Lone Ranger, The Life and Legend of Wyatt Earp (one episode as Ben Thompson), Shotgun Slade, The Deputy, Bonanza, Bat Masterson, The Adventures of Jim Bowie, Trackdown, Tales of Wells Fargo, Yancy Derringer, Laramie, Two Faces West, Lawman, Wanted: Dead or Alive, The Restless Gun, The Rough Riders, Dick Powell's Zane Grey Theatre, Pony Express, Rawhide, Mackenzie's Raiders, Have Gun – Will Travel, The Texan, The Man from Blackhawk, Hotel de Paree, Overland Trail, Maverick, The Virginian, The Big Valley, Bat Masterson, Laredo, The Outcasts, Wagon Train (five times), and Robert Conrad's The Wild Wild West.

Other television roles
Coy portrayed Jason Farrel in the ABC soap opera Flame in the Wind (1965), King Zorvac in the syndicated science fiction series Rocky Jones, Space Ranger (1954) and Jason in the ABC serial A Time for Us. 

Other guest-starring roles in drama include Crusader, The Pepsi-Cola Playhouse, Crossroads, Whirlybirds, U.S. Marshal, Rescue 8, The Lineup, East Side/West Side, Mr. Adams and Eve, Mike Hammer, The Defenders, The Man from U.N.C.L.E., Navy Log, Tightrope, Lock-Up, Lassie, Ironside, M Squad, and I Spy. Coy also appeared in two comedies, McKeever and the Colonel and Hazel.

Coy's last television role was as Chief Blackfish on the NBC series Daniel Boone in the 1970 episode "How to Become a Goddess".

Selected filmography

 Love Letters of a Star (1936) - Charley Warren
 Barricade (1950) - Benson
 Colt .45 (1950) - Carl (uncredited)
 Saddle Tramp (1950) - Mr Phillips
 Under Mexicali Stars (1950) - Giles Starkey
 FBI Girl (1951) - Priest
 Bugles in the Afternoon (1952) - Capt. Benteen (uncredited)
 The Lusty Men (1952) - Buster Burgess
 Flat Top (1952) - Air Group Commander
 So Big (1953) - Roelf Pool
 All the Brothers Were Valiant (1953) - Noah Shore (uncredited)
 Phantom of the Rue Morgue (1954) - Gendarme Arnot (uncredited)
 Them! (1954) - Reporter (uncredited)
 Sign of the Pagan (1954) - Emperor Valentinian
 Cult of the Cobra (1955) - Police Inspector
 Wichita (1955) - Sam McCoy
 Running Wild (1955) - Lt. Ed Newpole
 The Searchers (1956) - Aaron Edwards
 On the Threshold of Space (1956) - Lt. Col. Dick Masters
 The Fastest Gun Alive (1956) - Clint Fallon (uncredited)
 The Young Guns (1956) - Sheriff Jim Peyton
 Pillars of the Sky (1956) - Maj. Donahue
 Hot Summer Night (1957) - Pete Wayne (uncredited)
 Johnny Tremain (1957) - Dr. Joseph Warren
 Juvenile Jungle (1958) - John Elliot
 South Seas Adventure (1958) - Supplemental Narration (voice)
 The Restless Gun (1959) - Episode "Dead Ringer"
 The Trap (1959) - Second Fake Policeman (uncredited)
 Gunmen from Laredo (1959) - Ben Keefer
 Warlock (1959) - Deputy Sheriff Ray Thomson (uncredited)
 The Gunfight at Dodge City (1959) - Ben Townsend
 North by Northwest (1959) - U.S. Intelligence Agency official (uncredited)
 Cash McCall (1960) - Reporter (uncredited)
 Five Guns to Tombstone (1960) - Ike Garvey
 Gun Fight (1961) - Sheriff
 Catlow (1971) - Parkman
 I Eat Your Skin (1971) - Charles Bentley
 Pancho Villa (1972) - Gen. Pershing
 Hay que matar a B. (1974) - (final film role)

References

External links
 
 

1909 births
1974 deaths
20th-century American male actors
American male film actors
American male television actors
People from Great Falls, Montana
Male actors from Montana
Male actors from Greater Los Angeles
People from Santa Maria, California
American male stage actors
American soap opera actors
Male Western (genre) film actors
Western (genre) television actors